Dr. Ragheb Hanafi Sergani (Arabic: راغب الحنفي راغب السرجاني / Alternative English spelling: Ragheb/Raghib, El-Sergany ·As-Sirjani, Raghib Al-Sirjani) is an Egyptian professor of urology at Cairo University as a member of its Faculty of Medicine. Dr. Ragheb El-Sergany is famous for his academic interest in Islamic history and has authored books on the subject while currently overseeing the website "IslamStory.com". He was born in El Mahalla El Kubra in the Gharbia Governorate.

He has published a number of books on Islamic history, and has several lectures on the history of Islam published on social media. With over 240,000 followers on Twitter and approximately 260,000 followers on Facebook, he has gained a large following online and in the Islamic social sphere.

Education 
 Graduated with honors from the Faculty of Medicine at Cairo University in 1988
 Completed his memorization of the Quran in 1991
 Served as a visiting instructor at Tulane University in New Orleans, LA from 1994-1997
 Earned a master's degree with honors from Cairo University in 1998
 Received a doctorate in kidney and urinary tract surgery with joint supervision from the United States and Egypt in 1998
 Assistant professor at the Faculty of Medicine at Cairo University
 Member of the International Union of Muslim Scholars
 Member of the American Urological Association
 Member of the Egyptian Urological Association

Books 

 The Causes of the Ummah's Defeat
 Spiritual Reading

References 

Academic staff of Cairo University
People from El Mahalla El Kubra
Egyptian urologists
Egyptian Muslim Brotherhood members
Cairo University alumni
Muslim writers
Egyptian writers
1964 births
Living people